Fanny Sanín Sader (born 1938) is a Colombian born artist from Bogotá who resides in New York City. The daughter of Gabriel Sanín Tobón and Fanny Sader Guerra, she is best known for her paintings of abstract geometric forms and colors. She is considered to be part of the second generation of abstract artists from Colombia.

She was awarded an Honoris Causa de Magíster en Artes (honorary master's degree of art) by University of Antioquia in February, 2015.

Her work has been featured in a volume entitled, Fanny Sanín: The Concrete Language of Color and Structure, which appeared in 2019.

Education and training
She graduated with a Master of Fine Arts from the University of Los Andes in 1960. She continued her studies in the areas of printmaking and art history at the University of Illinois. While living in London in the late 1960s, she studied engraving at the Chelsea School of Art.

Work 
Sanín has cited a number of specific influences, including Ellsworth Kelly, Wassily Kandinsky, and Henri Matisse. Her work is often compared to that of Carmen Herrera and Lygia Clark.

Sanín's work is in several public collections, including the Allen Memorial Art Museum in Oberlin, Ohio, where Sanín donated a painting in 2017. Acrylic No. 1, 2005 was donated by the artist in honor of the scholarly work of Edward J. Sullivan, Helen Gould Sheppard professor of Fine Arts at New York University. Additionally, the museum acquired three studies for this painting: Study for Painting No. 1 (3) 2005, Study for Painting No. 1 (5) 2005, and Study for Painting No. 1 (7) 2005.

Awards
 1970 Medellín Award, II Coltejer Art Biennial, Medellín, Colombia; Jury: Giulio Carlo Argan, Miguel Aguilera Cerni and Lawrence Alloway
 1985 Canadian Club Award, Mira: The Canadian Club Hispanic Art Tour, Museo del Barrio, New York
 1993 Colombia Award in Art given to Colombians living abroad, for contributions to the arts, Miami
 2006 Colombia Abroad Excellence Award given to Colombians who have excelled in their careers in the US, Miami
 2011 Caring for Colombia Award for her “Lifetime Contributions to the Arts”

Exhibitions 
In 1993 her painting Acrylic No. 6 was added to the permanent collection of the Art Museum of the Americas. Some of her other works have been added to the permanent collections of the Museo de Arte de la Universidad Nacional de Colombia, Museo de Arte Abstracto Manuel Felguérez (2003), Museo del Barrio de Nueva York (2011), National Museum of Women in the Arts (2011), La Tertulia Museum (2013), and the Museo Nacional de Colombia (2015).

Among the temporary exhibits in which she has participated are the Pinta Art Show (2007) and the Durban Segnini Gallery's Abstracción y Constructivismo: Continuidad y ruptura de la modernidad Latinoamericana (2015).

Solo exhibitions 
2017
 Equilibrium: Fanny Sanín, National Museum of Women in the Arts, Washington D.C
 Fanny Sanín, LA Louver, Los Angeles
 Fanny Sanín “En Abstracto”, Centro Colombo Americano, Bucaramanga

2016
 Fanny Sanín. The Balance of Color, Goya Contemporary, Baltimore
 Fanny Sanín: Pinturas, Museo Rayo, Roldanillo, Colombia
 Symmetry, Leon Tovar Gallery, New York, catalogue, essays by  Clayton Kirking

2015
 Fanny Sanín En Abstracto, Museo Nacional, Bogotá, Colombia, catalogue, essays by Germán Rubiano and Christian Padilla
 Folding: Line, Space & Body / Latin American Women Artists Working Around Abstraction, Henrique Faria Gallery, New York

2012
 Fanny Sanín Drawings and Studies 1960 to Now, Frederico Seve Gallery, New York, catalogue, essay by Patterson Sims

2010
 Fanny Sanín, Discipline in painting and sculpture (with Eduardo Ramírez Villamizar), Durban Segnini Gallery, Miami; Florida, catalogue, essay by Carlos M. Luis
 Fanny Sanín, Alonso Garcés Gallery, Bogotá, Colombia, catalogue, essay by Maria Belén Sáez de Ibarra

2008
 Fanny Sanín, A Chromatic Journey, 1966 – 2006, Latincollector, New York; catalogue, essay by Mónica Espinel
 3 Views of Abstraction, New Arts Gallery, Litchfield, CT

2007
 Fanny Sanín, La Struttura Cromatica, Instituto Italo-LatinoAmericano, Rome, Italy; catalogue, essay by Félix Angel

2005
 The Chromatic Structures of Fanny Saniín, 1074–2004, Colombian Embassy, Washington, DC; catalogue, essay by Félix Angel

2004
 Concrete Realities, Latincollector, New York; catalogue, essay by Edward Sullivan

2003
 National Arts Club, New York
 Gomez Gallery, Baltimore; catalogue, essay by Clayton Kirking

2000
 Color and Symmetry – Retrospective Exhibition 1987–1999, Germán Rubiano Caballero, Curator, Museo de Arte del Banco de la República, Bogotá, catalogue, essay by Germán Rubiano Caballero and José Ignacio Roca; Avianca Cultural Center, Barranquilla

1996
 Antioquia Museum, Medellín, Colombia, catalogue, essays by Maria Elvira Iriarte and Libe de Zulategui

1994
 Garcés Velasquez Gallery, Bogotá, Colombia, catalogue, essay by Richard Humphrey

1991
 InterAmerican Art Gallery, Sheldon Lurie, Curator, Miami-Dade Community College, Miami, FL, catalogue, essay by Donald Goodall

1990
 Greater Lafayette Museum of Art, Lafayette, Indiana, catalogue, essay by Sharon Theobald

1987
 Retrospective Exhibition, John Stringer, Curator, Museum of Modern Art, Bogotá, Colombia, catalogue, essays by John Stringer and Gloria Zea
 Traveling Retrospective Exhibition, Avianca Cultural Center, Barranquilla; Museum of Modern Art, Medellín; Museum of Modern Art, Cartagena, Colombia

1986
 Chamber of Commerce, Cali, Colombia
 Garcés Velasquez Gallery, Bogotá, Colombia
 Schiller-Wapner Gallery, New York, catalogue, essay by Mario Amaya

1984
 Juan Martin Gallery, Mexico City, Mexico
 Museo Rayo, Roldanillo, Colombia

1982
 Phoenix Gallery, New York, catalogue, essay by Peter Frank
 Garcés Velasquez Gallery, Bogotá, Colombia

1980
 Phoenix Gallery, New York, catalogue, essay by Ida E. Rubin

1979
 Garcés Velásquez Gallery, Bogotá, Colombia
 Quintero Gallery, Barranquilla, Colombia
 Museum of Modern Art, Mexico City, Mexico, catalogue, essay by Fernando Gamboa

1978
 University of Illinois, Urbana, Illinois
 Long Island University, New York

1977
 Phoenix Gallery, New York, catalogue, essay by Carla Gottlieb

1972
 National Institute of Culture and Fine Arts, Caracas, Venezuela

1970
 House of Culture Gallery, Monterrey, Mexico

1969
 Panamerican Union Gallery, Organization of American States, Washington, D.C.

1968
 AIA Gallery, London, England

1967
 Museum of Fine Arts, Caracas, Venezuela, catalogue, essay by Germán Rubiano Caballero

1966
 Colseguros Gallery, Bogotá, Colombia

1965
 Museum of Modern Art, Bogotá, Colombia
 Lake House Gallery, National University, Mexico City, Mexico
 Turok-Wasserman Gallery, Mexico City, Mexico
 Technological Institute of Monterrey, Curator, Manuel Rodríguez Vizcarra, Architecture Department, Monterrey, Mexico

1964
 Modern Art Gallery, Monterrey, Mexico

Select group exhibitions 
2017
 ArtBo, León Tovar Gallery, Bogotá
 Alonso Garcés galería, Bogotá
 Tefaf, León Tovar Gallery, New York
 Art New York, Durban Segnini Gallery, New York

2016
 Art Miami, Durban Segnini Gallery, Miami FL
 Colección de Arte AVIANCA, Museo de Arte Moderno de Cartagena, Colombia
 Fundadores, Museo de Arte Contemporáneo de Bogotá, Colombia
 ARCO 2016, Leon Tovar Gallery, Madrid, Spain
 The Illusive Eye, El Museo del Barrio, New York
 Art Depot – Corazon Verde Foundation, Bogotá Chamber of Commerce, Bogotá, Colombia

2015
 Gala Auction, Houston Museum of Art, Houston, Texas
 Vivarte Benefit Auction, Phillips, New York, NY
 Art Chicago Art Fair, Leon Tovar Gallery, Chicago, Illinois
 The Armory Show 2015, Leon Tovar Gallery, New York
 ARCO 2015, Leon Tovar Gallery, Madrid, Spain
 Members Exhibition, National Arts Club, New York
  Modern Art from the Avianca Collection, Museo de Arte de Pereira, Pereira, Colombia
 Referent Forms: Colombian Masters, Beta Galería, Bogotá, Colombia

2014
 Masters, Galería El Museo, Bogotá, Colombia
 Art Basel, Henrique Faria Gallery, Miami, Fl
  Benefit Auction, Bambi Homes, Gabarron Foundation, New York
  Herland – 8 women artists from the collection invite 8 women artists, Deutsche Bank, New York
 Benefit Auction, Fundación Corazon Verde, Christie's en Seminario Mayor, Bogotá, Colombia
  Group Show, Ellsworth Gallery, Santa Fe, New Mexico
  Remembering Grau, Julio Mario Santo Domingo Library, Bogotá, Colombia
 Kineticim and Geometry, Galería Alonso Garcés, Bogotá, Colombia
 Summer 2014, New Arts Projects, Litchfield, Connecticut
 Silence, Rumor, Shout, Museo de Arte Moderno, Mexico City, Mexico          
 Sala Moderrnidades, Museo Nacional, Bogotá, Colombia
 Constellations, Constructivism, Internationalism and the Latin-American Vanguard, Museo de San Pedro, Puebla, México
 “AVIANCA” Art Collection, Museo Rayo, Roldanillo, Valle, Colombia
 Objects: MMAA, Minnesota Museum of American Art, St. Paul, Minnesota
 Members Exhibition, National Arts Club, New York
 Propal Calendar 2014, Museo de Arte Moderno La Tertulia, Cali, Colombia

2013
 Collections in the Museum’s Collection, Museo de Arte Moderno de Bogotá, Bogotá, Colombia
 Stephen Petronio Company Benefit Auction, Metropolitan Pavilion, New York
 Aid for Aids Benefit Auction, New York
 Transformer Benefit Auction, Corcoran Gallery, Washington, D.C.
 Ibero-american Art, Centro Español, New York
 Classics, experimentals and radicals: Itineraries in Colombian Art 1950–1980, Art Collection, Banco de la República, Bogotá, Colombia
 Pan American Modernism: Avant-Garde in Latin America and the US, Catalogue essay by Edward Sullivan, Lowe Art Museum, University of Miami, Coral Gables, FL
 Permanent Collection, Museo del Barrio, New York
 13 Colombian Women Artists, Museo de Arte Moderno de Barranquilla, Barranquilla, Colombia
 Work on Paper, Sala Mendoza, curated by Pedro Tagliafico, Caracas, Venezuela
 Permanent Collection, National Museum of Women in the Arts, Washington, DC
 Formations, Frederico Seve Gallery, New York
 The Marvelous Real: Colombia through the Vision of its Artists, Interamerican Development Bank, Washington, DC
 Colección Permanente, Museo de Antioquia, Medellín, Colombia
 Grau and his Friends, Quinta Galería, Bogotá, Colombia        
 Avianca Collection, Museo Zenú de Arte Contemporáneo, sponsored by the Banco de la República and Museo de Arte Moderno de Bogotá, Montería, Colombia
 Permanent Collection, Museo de Antioquia, Medellín, Colombia
 Barcodes: Merging Identity and Technology, Soledad Salomé, Goya Contemporary (collaboration by Fanny Sanín), Baltimore
 Pinta Art Fair, Frederico Seve Gallery, London
 68,70, 72. Bienales de Arte Coltejer, Museo de Antioquia, Medellín, Colombia
 Visión de Arte Latino/Americano, Las Cortes de Cadiz: 200 Years of Identity, Instituto Cervantes, New York
 SolidArte 2013 Benefit Auction, El Museo Gallery, Bogotá, Colombia
 Benefit Auction El Cine en el Arte, Bogotá Film Festival, Bogotá, Colombia
 Colombian Masters, El Museo Gallery, Bogotá, Colombia
 30 years of Storefront – Benefit for Storefront for Art and Architecture, 5 Beekman Building, New York

2012
 Pinta Art Fair, Frederico Seve Gallery (New York) and Durban Segnini Gallery (Miami), New York
 Stephen Petronio Dance Company Benefit Auction, Metropolitan Pavilion, New York
 Barcodes: Merging Identity and Technology, Soledad Salomé, Art Basel (collaboration by Fanny Sanín), Miami
 Benefit Auction, Fundación Corazon Verde, Club El Nogal, Bogotá
 Artbo Art Fair, Alonso Garcés Galería and Arte Dos Grafica, Bogotá, Colombia
 Avianca Art Collection, Museum of Modern Art, Bogotá, Colombia and Museo de Arte Moderno, Baranquilla, Colombia
 Donaciones, Museo de Arte Contemporáneo ‘Minuto de Dios’, Bogotá, Colombia
 Benefit Auction for the Museum of Modern Art Ramirez Villamizar, Club El Nogal, Bogotá, Colombia
 Andinos Artists in the MAC Collection, Uniandinos Cultural Center, Bogotá, Colombia
 Group Show, Frederico Seve Gallery, New York
 Pinta Art Fair, Frederico Seve Gallery, London
 Red/Read Benefit for Storefront for Art and Architecture, Woolworth Building, New York
 Benefit Auction, Bambi Homes, Miami, Fl

2011
 Pinta Art Fair, Frederico Seve Gallery, New York
 Stephen Petronio Company Benefit Auction, Metropolitan Pavilion, New York
 Aid for Aids Benefit Auction, New York
 Benefit Auction, Bambi Homes, Gabarron Foundation, New York
 Artbo Art Fair, Alonso Garcés Galería, Bogotá, Colombia
 Benefit Auction, Conexión Colombia, Bogotá, Colombia
 Rayo Auction, Corazon Verde, Club El Nogal, Bogotá, Colombia
 Members Exhibition, National Arts Club, New York      
 Diversidad y Rompimiento, Museo Rayo, Roldnillo, Colombia
 Pinta Art Fair, Frederico Seve Gallery, London
 Centenary Exhibition, New York Public Library, New York
 Introspection: 15 Year Celebration, New Arts Gallery, Litchfield, Connecticut
 Permanent Collection, National Museum of Women in the Arts, Washington, DC
 Trajectories V: An Explosion of Color, Uniandinos Cultural Center, Bogotá, Colombia
 Permanent Collection, El Museo del Barrio, New York
 Art in Embassies Program, American Embassy, San Salvador, El Salvador

2010
 Pinta Art Fair, Latincollector, New York
 Art in America, Palacio de la Moneda, Santiago de Chile, Chile
 Benefit Auction, Conexión Colombia, Bogotá, Colombia
 Pinta Art Fair, Latincollector, London
 Geometry, Homage to Leo Matiz, La Cometa Gallery, Bogotá, Colombia
 Geometric Illusions, Frederico Seve Gallery, New York
 Then & Now, Abstraction in Latin American Art from 1950 to Present, Monica Esquivel, Curator, Deutsche Bank, New York
 SolidArte Benefit Auction, El Museo Gallery, Bogotá, Colombia
 Members Exhibition, National Arts Club, New York

2009
 Permanent Collection, Greater Lafayette Museum of Art, West Lafayette, Indiana
 Pinta Art Fair, Latincollector, New York
 Geometric Abstract Works: The Latin American Vision from the 1950s, 60s and 70s, Henrique Faria Fine Art, New York
 Benefit Auction, Bambi Homes, Gabarron Foundation, New York
 Latin America Auction, Phillips de Pury, Latincollector, New York
 Benefit Auction, Conexión Colombia, Bogotá, Colombia
 Benefit Auction, NACA Foundation, Consulate of Argentina, New York
 The Line is a Sign, Latincollector, New York
 Sala de Juntas –Colombian Artists in the Bancafe Collection, Museo Nacional, Bogotá, Colombia
 Members Exhibition, National Arts Club, New York

2008
 Pinta Art Fair, Latincollector, New York
 Benefit Auction, Conexión Colombia, La Cometa Gallery, Bogotá, Colombia
 Art in Embassies Program, American Embassy, Belgrade, Serbia
 Aid for Aids Auction, 120 Wall Street, New York
 Becarte, Fundación Dignificando, Bogotá, Colombia
 ArteAmericas Art Fair, Latincollector, Miami

2007
 Abstracción Geométrica, Museo de Arte del Tolima, Ibagué, Colombia
 Pinta Art Fair, Latincollector, New York
 Artbo Art Fair, Alonso Garcés Galería, Bogotá, Colombia
 Balelatina Art Fair, Latincollector, Basel, Switzerland
 Remarte, Organization of American States, Washington, DC
 Colombian Art from the Collection of the Bogotá Museum of Modern Art, 1960-2000, Museum of Modern Art, Bogotá, Colombia
 Geometric Abstraction in Colombia, Galería Mundo, Bogotá, Colombia
 Group Exhibition, Latincollector, New York

2006
 Members Exhibition, National Arts Club, New York
 Proyecto 40, Museo de Arte Contemporáneo, Bogotá, Colombia
 Geometry and Gesture from the Collection, Museum of Art of the Americas, Washington, DC
 2005   Members Exhibition, National Arts Club, New York
 Arte y Diversidad, Alonso Garcés Galería, Bogotá, Colombia
 Abstraction and Geometry, Alonso Garcés Galería, Bogotá, Colombia
 Benefit Auction, National Museum, Bogotá, Colombia
 Selected Paintings and Photographs by Gallery Artists, Latincollector, New York

2004
 Members Show, National Arts Club, New York
 Latin American Art: Contexts and Accomplices, Sainsbury Centre for Visual Arts, University of East Anglia, Norwich, England

2003
 Members Show, National Arts Club, New York
 Solo Dibujo, Luis Cantillo, Curator, Museum of Art, National University, Bogotá, Colombia
 Two Artists, Gomez Gallery, Baltimore, MD
 Beyond the Line, Alonso Garcés Galería, Bogotá, Colombia
 Permanent Collection, Museum of Art of the Americas, Washington, DC

2002
 Homage to Eduardo Ramírez Villamizar, Diners Gallery, Bogotá, Colombia

2001
 Contemporary Colombian Artists: Four Perspectives, Carol Ann Lorenz, Curator, Colgate University, Hamilton, New York
 Art, Memory and Society, Lilia Gallo, Curator, Nacional Archives, Bogotá
 Permanent Collection, Inaugural Exhibition, Museo de Arte Abstracto Manuel Felguerez, Zacatecas, México

1999
 Virtual Portfolio, University Art Museum, Arizona State University, Tempe, Arizona
 XX Century Colombian Art, Ana Sokoloff, Curator, Christie's, London
 ICCC Benefit Art Auction, The National Arts Club, New York
 1998
 Art in the 50 Years of the University of los Andes, Christie's, Bogotá, Colombia
 Abstract Art in Colombia, Marta Rodriguez, Curator, Museum of Art, National University, Bogotá

1997
 Colors: Contrasts & Cultures, Benjamin Ortiz, Curator, The Discovery Museum, Bridgeport, CN
 Rethinking Geometry, Rina Carvajal, Curator, Yale University – Art Assets, New York
 Crossing Borders, Benjamin Ortiz and Gustavo Valdez, Jr., Curators, Castle Gallery, College of New Rochelle, New Rochelle, N.Y.

1996
 Preserving the Past, Securing the Future, The National Museum of Women in the Arts, Washington, DC

1995–96
 Latin American Women Artists 1915–1995, Gerry Biller, Curator, Milwaukee Art Museum, Milwaukee, WI. Traveling exhibition: Phoenix Art Museum, Phoenix, AZ; Denver Art Museum; Museo de las Americas, Denver, CO; National Museum of Women in the Arts, Washington, DC; Center for Fine Arts, Miami, FL

1995
 Reconstructivism: New Geometric Paintings in New York, Peter Frank, Curator, Space 504, New York

1994
 Latin American Artists in Washington Collections, Felix Angel, Curator, Inter-American Development Bank Cultural Center, Washington, DC
 Third Ibero-American Fine Arts Salon, Brazilian American Cultural Institute, Washington, D.C.

1993
 Latin America and the Caribbean in Contemporary Painting, Interamerican Bank for Development, Hamburg, Germany

1992
 From Torres-Garcia to Soto, Bélgica Rodríguez, Curator, Art Museum of the Americas, Washington, D.C
 Six Latin American Women Artists, Richard Humphrey and Robert Metzger, Curators, Center Art Gallery, Bucknell University, Lewisburg, Pennsylvania
 Small Works on Paper by Outstanding Colombian Artists, 1942–1992, Colombian Consulate Art Gallery, Washington, D.C.

1991
 Bogotá International Art Fair, Negret Gallery, Bogotá, Colombia

1990
 The Reductive Image, Andrea Marquit Fine Arts, Boston
 Homage to the Square, Nohra Haime Gallery, New York
 Anthology: Works from the Permanent Collection, Biblioteca Luís Ángel Arango, Bogotá, Colombia

1989
 Latin American Artists, Liza Rabinowitz, Curator, Bloomfield College, Bloomfield, New Jersey
 The Woman Artist, Alfred Wild Gallery, Bogotá, Colombia
 3 Decades of Uniandes Art, Maria Teresa Guerrero, Curator, Biblioteca Luis Angel Arango, Bogotá, Colombia
 6AT6 – A Collective of Contemporary Colombian Art, Carla Stellweg, Curator, Rempire Fine Art, New York

1988
 From Bogotá to Santa Fe; Bogotá 450 Years, Acosta Valencia Gallery, Bogotá, Colombia

 1986
 II La Habana Biennial, National Museum of Fine Arts, La Habana, Cuba
 Into the Mainstream, Giulio Blanc, Curator, Jersey City Museum, Jersey City, NJ
 Diamond Jubilee 1911–1986, New Orleans Museum of Art, New Orleans
 10th Anniversary, New England Center for Contemporary Art, Brooklyn, Connecticut
 Canadian Club Tour, Hyde Park Art Center, Chicago
 In Homage to Ana Mendieta, Zeus/Trabia Gallery, New York

1985–86
 One Hundred Years of Colombian Art, Inaugural exhibition, Museum of Modern Art, Bogotá, Colombia. Traveling exhibition: Imperial Palace, Rio de Janeiro, Brazil; São Paulo Cultural Center, São Paulo, Brazil; Italian – Latin American Institute, Rome, Italy; Centro Cultural Avianca, Barranquilla, Colombia

1985
 Geometric Abstraction in Latin American Art 1914–1984, CDS Gallery, New York
 Group Show, Elida Lara Gallery, Barranquilla, Colombia
 Inaugural Exhibition, Museum of Contemporary Hispanic Art, New York
 The Language of Color, Museum of Contemporary Art, Bogotá, Colombia
 Projects for the Medellin Airport, Biblioteca Luis Angel Arango, Bogotá; Museum of Modern Art, Medellin, Colombia
 Women in the Fine Arts, Museum of Contemporary Art, Bogotá, Colombia
 Visual Cross-Currents: Latin American Artists Living in New York, Art Consult International Gallery, Boston
 Christopher Columbus Painting Award, Centro Cultural Conde Duque, Madrid, Spain
 Marta Traba: Her Vision of Art in Colombia, Museum of Modern Art, Bogotá, Colombia
  Latin American Artists in New York, Art Consult Gallery, Panama City, Panama
  5 Abstract Artists, Garcés Velásquez Gallery, Bogotá, Colombia
 3rd Latin American Graphic Arts Biennial, Cayman Gallery, New York

1983
  Colombia: Art of the Studio, Art of the Street, School of Fine Arts, Paris, France
 Permanent Collection, National University Art Museum, Bogotá, Colombia
 Latin American Women Artists, Central Hall Artists, New York
 Celebration Garcia Marquez, Hofstra University, Hempstead, New York
 Artistic Panorama of Graphic Arts in Colombia, El Callejon Gallery, Bogotá, Colombia
 Colombian Art Exhibition, Colombian Center, New York
 Colombian Artists in the Unicef Collection, Pluma Gallery, Bogotá, Colombia
 Christopher Columbus Painting Award, Santa Fe Art Gallery, District Planetarium, Bogotá, Colombia
 Cartón de Colombia Exhibition, Museum of Modern Art, Bogotá, Colombia

1982
 25 Years of the Form and Space Movement, Museum of Contemporary Art, Santiago, Chile
 Women of the Americas, Kouros Gallery and Center for Interamerican Relations, New York
 A Mini Salon, Kouros Gallery, New York

1981
 Colombian Art in the 80s, The Rutherford Barnes Collection, Denver, CO
 Twentieth Century Colombian Art, Colombian-American Center, Bogotá, Colombia
 4th Art Biennial, Medellin, Colombia
 Monologus, Henry Street Settlement, New York
 Colombian Artists, Amparo's Gallery, Miami
 Expo Arte ’81, Cochabamba, Santa Cruz, Bolivia
 Interart ’81, United Nations Playhouse, New York
 14 Contemporary Latin American Artists, Castle Gallery, College of New Rochelle, New Rochelle, New York
 Thirteen Collection, Sotheby's Parke-Bernet, New York
 Abstract Masters, Iriarte Gallery, Bogotá, Colombia

1979
  National Drawing ’79, Rutgers University, New Jersey
 Manhattan, Phoenix Gallery, New York
 Latin American Art, Juan Martin Gallery, Mexico City, Mexico

1978
 Variations on Latin Themes in New York, Center for Interamerican Relations, New York
 Trends, Cayman Gallery, New York
 Pan-American Paintings, Ward Gallery, Rochester, New York
 Work on Paper, Museo de Artes Gráficas, Maracaibo, Venezuela
 Process as Art, Phoenix Gallery, New York
 Resurgimiento 1978, Inaugural Exhibition, Museo del Barrio, New York
 Permanent Collection, Museum of Modern Art, Bogotá, Colombia

1977
 Magnet/Geometry/Magnet, Cayman Gallery, New York; 1978, Interamerican Bank, Washington, D.C.
 Three Abstract Artists. Taller 5, Bogotá, Colombia
 Winter Group Show, Phoenix Gallery, New York
  New Artists, Museum of Modern Art, Bogotá, Colombia
 August Salon, Museum of Contemporary Art, Bogotá, Colombia
 Summer Group Show, Phoenix Gallery, New York
 50 Years of Colombian Art, Casa de las Américas, Havana, Cuba
 40 Women Artists, Museum of Contemporary Art, Bogotá, Colombia

1976
 Four Colombian Artists, British Council, Bogotá, Colombia
 Iman-New York-Iman, Center for Interamerican Relations, New York; Museo de Ponce, Puerto Rico
 Current Colombian Painting, Museum of Art of the National University, Bogotá, Colombia
  Cork Gallery of Lincoln Center, New York
 Memorial Library Gallery, New York
 Group Show, AIR Gallery, London
 Artists Choice, Chatham College, Pittsburgh; State University of New York, Binghamton; Virginia Polytechnic Institute, Blacksburg, Virginia
 Group Show, Phoenix Gallery, New York
 New Acquisitions, Museo de Zea, Medellín, Colombia
 1975   Works on Paper – Women Artists, Brooklyn Museum, New York; Center for the Performing Arts, C.U.N.Y., New York
 Recent Acquisitions of 10 Major Works, Gruenebaum Gallery, New York
 Women Artists – Soho Festival, WIA Gallery, New York
 Young Artists ’75, United Nations Playhouse, New York
 Farleigh Dickinson University, New Jersey

1974
 3 Abstract Artists, Carmen Rada, Curator, Monte Avila Gallery, Bogotá
 Colombian Art of Today, Gallery of the Eugenio Mendoza Foundation in association with Museo de Arte Moderno de Bogota, Caracas, Venezuela

1973
 Art Lift 459, Interart Center, New York

1972
 Group Show, Women in the Arts, C.W. Post College, Long Island University, New York
 3rd Coltejer Art Biennial, Medellin, Colombia
 Latinamerican Art, Institute of Latin-American Studies, Columbia University, New York

1970
 XX Anniversary, Icetex, Bogotá, Colombia
  2nd Coltejer Art Biennial, Medellin, Colombia

1968
 Summer Exhibit, Royal Society of British Painters, London
 1st Iberoamerican Painting Biennial, Medellin, Colombia
 New Members, AIA Gallery, London
 Trends 1968, FBA Galleries, London
 Collection of the Museo de Arte Contemporaneo, Centro Colombo-Americano, Bogotá, Colombia
 Centro Colombo-Venezolano, Caracas, Venezuela

1967
 I Caracas Art Festival INCIBA, El Muro Gallery, Caracas
 Galería Ervico, sponsored by the Museum of Modern Art, Bogotá, Colombia; also at the Montenegro Council, Quindío, Colombia
 I Edinburgh Open 100, Edinburgh Festival, Edinburgh, Scotland

1966
 Museum of the Audiovisual Center, Universidad de los Andes, Bogotá, Colombia

Danetti Gallery, Bogotá, Colombia

1964
 I Intercol Salon of Young Artists, Museum of Modern Art, Bogotá, Colombia
 National Salon of Women Artists, IV National Arts Festival, Cali, Colombia

1963
 November Salon, Arte AC, Monterrey, Mexico

1962 to 1974
 National Art Salons, Museo Nacional, Bogotá, Colombia

References

External links

 Fanny Sanin (Colombian, born 1938) - Auction Results
 Fanny Sanín: una vida consagrada a la pintura 
 Fanny Sanin

1938 births
Living people
20th-century Colombian women artists
21st-century Colombian women artists
People from Bogotá
Colombian painters
University of Los Andes (Colombia) alumni
University of Illinois alumni
Artists from New York City
Colombian women painters